Deva Temple is a  summit located in the Grand Canyon, in Coconino County of northern Arizona, USA. Its nearest higher neighbor is Brahma Temple, 1.5 mile to the south. Other neighbors include Zoroaster Temple 2.5 miles to the south-southwest, Manu Temple three miles to the west-northwest, and Buddha Temple, 3.5 miles to the west. Deva Temple was named by Henry Gannett, a geographer for Clarence Dutton, in following Dutton's practice of naming features in the Grand Canyon after mythological deities, in this case, Deva. This geographical feature's name was officially adopted in 1906 by the U.S. Board on Geographic Names. According to the Köppen climate classification system, Deva Temple is located in a Cold semi-arid climate zone.

Geology

The summit of Deva Temple is composed of cream-colored, cliff-forming, Permian Coconino Sandstone with a small, remnant Kaibab Limestone caprock. The sandstone, which is the third-youngest of the strata in the Grand Canyon, was deposited 265 million years ago as sand dunes. Below the Coconino Sandstone is slope-forming, Permian Hermit Formation, which in turn overlays the Pennsylvanian-Permian Supai Group. Further down are strata of Mississippian Redwall Limestone, Cambrian Tonto Group, and finally Proterozoic Unkar Group at creek level. Precipitation runoff from Deva Temple drains south into the Colorado River via Bright Angel Creek on its west side, and Clear Creek on the east side.

Gallery

See also
 Geology of the Grand Canyon area

References

External links 

 Weather forecast: National Weather Service

Grand Canyon
Landforms of Coconino County, Arizona
Mountains of Arizona
Mountains of Coconino County, Arizona
North American 2000 m summits
Colorado Plateau
Grand Canyon National Park
Grand Canyon, North Rim
Sandstone formations of the United States